2020 Florida Amendment 3 would have amended the Florida Constitution to establish an open top-two primary system for all state elections held in Florida. The amendment failed to reach 60% of voters' support and hence failed to be enacted.

Contents 
The amendment on all statewide ballots November 3, 2020, read as follows:No. 3 Constitutional Amendment Article VI, Section 5. Allows all registered voters to vote in primaries for state legislature, governor, and cabinet regardless of political party affiliation. All candidates for an office, including party nominated candidates, appear on the same primary ballot. Two highest vote getters advance to general election. If only two candidates qualify, no primary is held and winner is determined in general election. Candidate’s party affiliation may appear on ballot as provided by law. Effective January 1, 2024.

Results

References 

Florida law